The 1940 Cleveland Indians season was a season in American major league baseball. The team finished second in the American League with a record of 89–65, one game behind the Detroit Tigers. Had the Indians finished ahead of the Tigers, The Indians would have played their cross state National League rivals, the National League Champion Cincinnati Reds, in the World Series. The World Series would have been the only all Ohio World series. The season is infamous for ten Indian players confronting owner Alva Bradley and demanding the removal of manager Ossie Vitt, saying the man's behavior was harming the team. When the news broke, the public sided with Vitt and the Indians were dismissed as "crybabies." The movement has since been named the "Crybaby Mutiny."

Regular season 
 April 16, 1940: Indians pitcher Bob Feller threw what is, to date, the only Opening Day no-hitter. Feller walked five and struck out eight as the Indians beat the White Sox, 1–0, at Comiskey Park.

Season standings

Record vs. opponents

Notable transactions 
 May 13, 1940: Willis Hudlin was released by the Indians.

Opening Day Lineup

Roster

Player stats

Batting

Starters by position 
Note: Pos = Position; G = Games played; AB = At bats; H = Hits; Avg. = Batting average; HR = Home runs; RBI = Runs batted in

Other batters 
Note: G = Games played; AB = At bats; H = Hits; Avg. = Batting average; HR = Home runs; RBI = Runs batted in

Pitching

Starting pitchers 
Note: G = Games pitched; IP = Innings pitched; W = Wins; L = Losses; ERA = Earned run average; SO = Strikeouts

Other pitchers 
Note: G = Games pitched; IP = Innings pitched; W = Wins; L = Losses; ERA = Earned run average; SO = Strikeouts

Relief pitchers 
Note: G = Games pitched; W = Wins; L = Losses; SV = Saves; ERA = Earned run average; SO = Strikeouts

Awards and honors 
All Star Game

Lou Boudreau, Shortstop

Bob Feller, Pitcher

Rollie Hemsley, Catcher

Ken Keltner, Third baseman

Ray Mack, Second baseman

Al Milnar, Pitcher

Farm system 

LEAGUE CHAMPIONS: Cedar Rapids

References

External links
1940 Cleveland Indians season at Baseball Reference

Cleveland Indians seasons
Cleveland Indians season
Cleveland Indians